Egbert Streuer (born 1 February 1954) is a Dutch former professional sidecar driver and arguably the most successful Dutch motorcycle racer of all time.

Assisted by passenger Bernard Schnieders he became world champion in 1984, 1985 and 1986. In the next five years, he was still in the final ranking in the top three. The sidecar class was at that time still a part of the world championship grand prix and there was a lot of competition. Streuers' main rivals were Rolf Biland, Steve Webster and Alain Michel. A total of 22 Grand Prix victories were achieved by Streuer, 15 with Bernard Schnieders.

Although Streuer and Schnieders had already celebrated triumphs in almost all circuits but would initially fail in their own hometown, to win. A victory at the Dutch TT was at one time more important than anywhere else in the world. In 1987, they finally went first across the finish line in their home GP. Streuer repeated this feat in 1991.

The first sidecar passenger of Streuer was Johan van der Kaap who participated between 1978 and 1980 in the Grands Prix. After van der Kaap quit for personal reasons in 1981, Bernard Schnieders took his place.

Schnieders stopped after the end of 1988 his place was taken by Geral de Haas which yielded two World Championship runner up places in 1989 and 1990. In 1991 and 1992 the Englishman Peter Brown took place in the chair but further successes were not to be.

Streuer not only known as a fast and safe driver, but also as a gifted technician. With his rugged beard and imposing moustache, he was a striking figure in the paddock, although he remained rather modest in the background. Streuer is father of 2015 Sidecar World Champion Bennie Streuer.

References

External links

Living people
1954 births
Dutch motorcycle racers
Sidecar racers
People from Assen
Sportspeople from Drenthe
20th-century Dutch people